Sir Julian Michael Gordon Critchley (8 December 1930 – 9 September 2000) was a British journalist, author and Conservative Party politician. He was the member of parliament for Rochester and Chatham from 1959 to 1964 and Aldershot from 1970 to 1997.

Early life
Born in Islington, the son of distinguished neurologist Macdonald Critchley, CBE (1900–1997) and his first wife, midwife Edna Audleth (née Morris), Critchley was brought up in Swiss Cottage, North London, and in Shropshire, where he attended Brockhurst School, a preparatory school in Church Stretton, and later Shrewsbury School.  He returned to London to take his Higher Certificate and was rejected from National Service after contracting polio.  After a year living and studying at the Sorbonne in Paris he went up in 1951 to Pembroke College, Oxford, where he read Politics, Philosophy and Economics. In 1953 he was part of a team of Oxford undergraduates lobbying Vickers shipyard workers against nationalisation; the others were Michael Heseltine, Guy Arnold and Martin Morton.

Political career

Critchley served as a Conservative Member of Parliament, first for Rochester and Chatham from 1959 to 1964 and then for Aldershot from 1970 until his retirement in 1997. While he was out of Parliament between 1964 and 1970 he worked as a journalist, including as a TV critic for The Times, and he continued to be active as a journalist and author throughout the remainder of his career. Having lost Rochester and Chatham in 1964, he stood again for the seat in 1966 election, but was once again defeated by the Labour candidate Anne Kerr.

Critchley was considered to be on the left wing of the Conservative Party (one of the "wets" in Thatcherite terminology) and never attained ministerial rank. He became identified as a prominent Tory critic of Margaret Thatcher. In 1980 he sparked controversy by writing an anonymous article in The Observer signed "by a Tory", in which he criticised Thatcher's "A level economics" and called her "didactic, tart and obstinate".  He was later forced to admit authorship. He also memorably referred to Thatcher as "the great she-elephant" and claimed responsibility for the currency of the phrase "one of us", which she used privately to refer to any colleague whom she saw as loyal and supportive of her policies. (It was used by Hugo Young as the title of his biography of Thatcher.) Critchley was, however, supportive of Thatcher's stance at the time of the Falklands War.

Critchley was a long-standing friend of Michael Heseltine, having met him first at preparatory school. Both then went on to Shrewsbury and Pembroke College, Oxford, and Critchley was best man at Heseltine's wedding. Their friendship waned in the 1960s, but Critchley still supported Heseltine in the 1990 leadership election.

From the early 1990s Critchley became severely restricted in mobility from complications arising from the polio from which he had suffered as a young man. Still, he successfully re-contested Aldershot at the election in 1992. He then became an infrequent attender at the House of Commons until his retirement in 1997.  He was knighted in 1995.

Later life

After his retirement he was expelled from the mainstream Conservative party for backing the Pro-Euro Conservative Party in the 1999 European Parliament election.  He died the next year in Hereford from prostate cancer aged 69. He was married twice, and had four children. In later life he settled in Shropshire at Ludlow, and was buried in the parish churchyard at Wistanstow near Craven Arms.
Critchley became highly regarded as a witty and acerbic political writer and journalist, increasingly so towards the end of his life.  His 1994 volume of memoirs, A Bag of Boiled Sweets, was described by Jeremy Paxman as "the most entertaining set of political memoirs to have been published in years". He also wrote two mystery novels set in Parliament, Hung Parliament and Floating Voter, which feature an MP turned sleuth apparently based on Critchley himself along with a mixture of real and invented MPs, the latter providing the victims and suspects.

Publications
 Critchley, Julian, Westminster Blues, London, 1981
 Critchley, Julian, The Palace of Varieties, London, 1983
 Critchley, Julian, Heseltine – The Unauthorised Biography, André Deutsch, London, September 1987, 
 Critchley, Julian, A Bag of Boiled Sweets, Faber and Faber, London, 1994,

References

External links
 
 Former MP Critchley dies
 Guardian Obituary

1930 births
2000 deaths
20th-century British journalists
20th-century English novelists
20th-century English male writers
Alumni of Pembroke College, Oxford
Conservative Party (UK) MPs for English constituencies
Deaths from cancer in England
Deaths from prostate cancer
English male journalists
English male novelists
English television critics
Knights Bachelor
Members of the Bow Group
People educated at Shrewsbury School
People from Swiss Cottage
Politicians awarded knighthoods
Politicians of the Pro-Euro Conservative Party
The Times journalists
UK MPs 1959–1964
UK MPs 1970–1974
UK MPs 1974
UK MPs 1974–1979
UK MPs 1979–1983
UK MPs 1983–1987
UK MPs 1987–1992
UK MPs 1992–1997
Writers from London
Writers from Ludlow